Turku University may refer to:

 Åbo Akademi University
 The Royal Academy of Turku
 Turku School of Economics
 Turku University of Applied Sciences
 The University of Turku